Carolyn Laurie Kane (born June 18, 1952) is an American actress. She became known in the 1970s and 1980s in films such as Hester Street (for which she received an Academy Award nomination for Best Actress), Dog Day Afternoon, Annie Hall, The Princess Bride and Scrooged.

Kane appeared on the television series Taxi in the early 1980s, as Simka Gravas, the wife of Latka, the character played by Andy Kaufman, winning two Emmy Awards for her work. She has played the character of Madame Morrible in the musical Wicked, both in touring productions and on Broadway from 2005 to 2014. From 2015 to 2020, she was a main cast member on the Netflix series Unbreakable Kimmy Schmidt, in which she played Lillian Kaushtupper. During the Star Trek Day 2022 streaming event, it was announced Kane would be joining the Season 2 cast of Star Trek: Strange New Worlds.

Early life 
Kane was born in Cleveland, Ohio, the daughter of Joy, a jazz singer, teacher, dancer, and pianist, and Michael Kane. Her family is Jewish, and her grandparents emigrated from Russia, Austria, and Poland. Her parents divorced when she was 12 years old. She attended the Cherry Lawn School, a boarding school in Darien, Connecticut, until 1965. She studied theater at HB Studio and also went to the Professional Children's School in New York City. Kane made her professional theater debut in a 1966 production of The Prime of Miss Jean Brodie, starring Tammy Grimes.

Career

Television 
Kane portrayed Simka Dahblitz-Gravas, wife of Latka Gravas (Andy Kaufman), on the American television series Taxi from 1981 to 1983. She received two Emmy Awards for her work in the series.

In 1984, Kane appeared in episode 12, season 3 of Cheers as Amanda, an acquaintance of Diane Chambers from her time spent in a mental institution.

Kane was a regular on the 1986 series All Is Forgiven, a regular on the 1990–1991 series American Dreamer, guest-starred on a 1994 episode of Seinfeld, a 1996 episode of Ellen and had a supporting role in the short-lived sitcom Pearl.

In 1988, Kane appeared in the Cinemax Comedy Experiment Rap Master Ronnie: A Report Card alongside Jon Cryer and the Smothers Brothers.

In January 2009, she appeared in the television series Two and a Half Men as the mother of Alan Harper's receptionist. In March 2010, Kane appeared in the television series Ugly Betty as Justin Suarez's acting teacher. In 2014, she had a recurring role in the TV series Gotham as Gertrude Kapelput, Oswald Cobblepot's (Penguin's) mother.

In 2015, she was cast as Lillian Kaushtupper, the landlord to the title character of Netflix's series Unbreakable Kimmy Schmidt. She reprised the role in the television movie Kimmy vs the Reverend.

In 2020, Kane was part of the ensemble cast of the Amazon series Hunters; it also includes Al Pacino and Logan Lerman.

It was announced at Star Trek Day 2022 that Kane was joining the cast of Star Trek: Strange New Worlds as Chief Engineer Pelia.

Films 

Kane appeared in Carnal Knowledge (1971), The Last Detail (1973), Hester Street (1975), Dog Day Afternoon (1975), Annie Hall (1977), The World's Greatest Lover (1977), When a Stranger Calls (1979), Norman Loves Rose (1982), Transylvania 6-5000 (1985), The Princess Bride (1987), Scrooged (1988), in which Variety called her "unquestionably [the] pic's comic highlight"; Flashback (1989), with Dennis Hopper; and as a potential love interest for Steve Martin's character in My Blue Heaven (1990).

In 1998, she played Mother Duck on the cartoon movie The First Snow of Winter. In 1999, she made a cameo in the Andy Kaufman biopic Man on the Moon as her Taxi character.

At the 48th Academy Awards, Kane was nominated for an Academy Award for Best Actress for her role in the film Hester Street.

Theatre 
She starred in the off-Broadway play Love, Loss, and What I Wore in February 2010.

Kane made her West End debut in January 2011 in a major revival of Lillian Hellman's drama The Children's Hour at London's Comedy Theatre. She starred alongside Keira Knightley, Elisabeth Moss and Ellen Burstyn.

In May 2012, Kane appeared on Broadway as Betty Chumley in a revival of the play Harvey.

Wicked 
Kane is also known for her portrayal of the evil headmistress Madame Morrible in the Broadway musical Wicked, whom she played in various productions from 2005 to 2014.

Kane made her Wicked debut on the 1st National Tour, playing the role from March 9 through December 19, 2005. She then reprised the role in the Broadway production from January 10 through November 12, 2006. She again played the role for the Los Angeles production which began performances on February 7, 2007. She left the production on December 30, 2007, and later returned on August 26, 2008, until the production closed on January 11, 2009.

She then transferred with the L.A. company, to play the role once again, in the San Francisco production which began performances January 27, 2009. She ended her limited engagement on March 22, 2009. Kane returned to the Broadway company of Wicked from July 1, 2013, through February 22, 2014 (a period that included the show's 10th anniversary).

Filmography

Film

Television

Stage

Music Videos

Awards and nominations

Notes

References

External links 
 

1952 births
20th-century American actresses
21st-century American actresses
Actresses from Cleveland
American film actresses
American musical theatre actresses
American television actresses
American voice actresses
American people of Russian-Jewish descent
California Democrats
Jewish American actresses
Jewish American comedians
Living people
Ohio Democrats
Outstanding Performance by a Lead Actress in a Comedy Series Primetime Emmy Award winners
Outstanding Performance by a Supporting Actress in a Comedy Series Primetime Emmy Award winners
21st-century American Jews